Dhiffushi may refer to several small islands in the Maldives

 Dhiffushi (Alif Dhaal Atoll)
 Dhiffushi (Kaafu Atoll)
 Dhiffushi, in the Kolhumadulu Atoll